The 2020 season was Melaka United Soccer Association's 96th season in club history and 4th season in the Malaysia Super League.

Kits
 Supplier: al-Ikhsan
 Main sponsors: RedOne
 Other sponsors: Restoran Melayu, Hatten Groups

Management team

Players

Transfers

Pre-season

In

Out

Return From Loan

Extension of contract

Mid-Season

Out

Friendlies

Pre-season

Tour of Indonesia

Mid-Season

Competitions

Overview

Malaysia Super League

Fixtures and results

Table

Malaysia FA Cup

cancelled

Malaysia Cup

Statistics

Appearances and goals
As @ 20 Sept 2020

Notes

References 

Melaka United F.C.
Melaka United F.C. seasons
Melaka United
Malaysian football club seasons by club